Gozzano may refer to:

 Gozzano, Italy, a municipality in Piedmont, northern Italy
 Guido Gozzano (1883-1916), an Italian poet and writer